Riada may refer to:

Liadh Ní Riada (born 1966), Irish politician
Seán Ó Riada (1931–1971), Irish  composer
Riada Stadium, sports facility in Ballymoney, County Antrim, Northern Ireland